This is the list of the prisoners released by Israel as part of the Gilad Shalit prisoner exchange agreement with Hamas in exchange for the Israel Defense Forces (IDF) soldier Gilad Shalit.

The agreement is implemented in two stages – In the first stage, Gilad Shalit was transferred from the Gaza Strip to Egypt and from there to Israel; concurrently, Israel released 477 prisoners. In the second stage, which took place during December 2011, another 550 prisoners were released.

The 1,027 prisoners released were mainly Palestinians and Arab-Israelis, though among the prisoners released there was also a Syrian, Ukrainian and a Jordanian. 280 of these were sentenced to life in prison for planning and perpetrating violent attacks against Israelis. The military Hamas leader Ahmed Jabari was quoted in the Saudi Arabian newspaper Al-Hayat as confirming that the prisoners released as part of the deal were collectively responsible for the killing of 569 Israeli civilians.

In October 2012, data compiled by the Israeli government indicated that dozens of the released Palestinian prisoners in the Gilad Shalit prisoner exchange had resumed terrorist activity.  Many of them have joined the leadership of Hamas, other Palestinian prisoners have instead developed weapons and fired rockets at Israeli population centers, and some have recruited members to new terrorist cells in the West Bank.  One of these cells in Hebron planted a bomb and plotted to kidnap an Israeli soldier.  Prisoners in the West Bank have also engaged in violent acitivty, and Israel arrested 40 of them for rioting, hurling Molotov cocktails, handling funding for terrorism, and other acts.

First phase: 477 prisoners released on October 18, 2011 
In the first stage of the prisoner swap deal Israel released 477 prisoners, 450 men and 27 women.

The official list, which includes the crimes the prisoners were convicted of, was published by the Israel Prison Services and is available in Hebrew only, though a Google Translate version into English has been placed online as well.

 Notes
 Home – means the prisoner will be returned to their homeland and, if their destination is the West Bank or Jerusalem, will be allowed to travel within those areas.
 Security Arrangement – means the prisoner's movement will be restricted, and they will be required to report to the Israeli military once a month.
 Relocation – means the prisoner will not be returned home, but rather deported to Gaza or to a foreign country. Deportation period will either be 3 years or indefinitely.  A total of 42 prisoners have been relocated abroad:  16 to Syria, 15 to Qatar and 11 to Turkey.
 Destination – The "destination" for each prisoner is determined by the Israeli government.

Second phase: 550 prisoners released in December 2011 
The 550 remaining prisoners were released in December 2011. Israel alone determined the list of prisoners to be released, though in consultation with Egypt. The list consisted of 300 Fatah prisoners, 50 PFLP members, and 20 DFLP members, with the rest having no political affiliation. According to Israeli criteria, none of those selected for release had "blood on their hands".

See also 
 Gilad Shalit prisoner exchange
 Israeli prisoner exchanges
 2008 Israel–Hezbollah prisoner exchange
 Jibril Agreement
 Pidyon Shvuyim

References 

2011 in Israel
Prisoners
Extradition
2011 in international relations
2011 in the Palestinian territories
Palestinian
Gilad Shalit
Israeli prisoner exchanges
Lists of prisoners and detainees